Scyrotis is a genus of moths in the family Cecidosidae.

Species
Scyrotis alticolaria Mey, 2007
Scyrotis athleta Meyrick, 1909
Scyrotis brandbergensis Mey, 2007
Scyrotis granosa (Meyrick, 1912)
Scyrotis kochi Mey, 2007
Scyrotis matoposensis Mey, 2007
Scyrotis namakarooensis Mey, 2007
Scyrotis pulleni Mey, 2007
Scyrotis trivialis (Meyrick, 1913)

References

Cecidosidae
Adeloidea genera
Taxa named by Edward Meyrick